Kim Koppelman is a state legislator serving in the North Dakota House of Representatives.  He was elected in 1994, and subsequently re-elected in 1996, 1998, 2002 and 2006 (North Dakota House member terms changed from two to four years in 1998).  Koppelman served as the national chair of the Council of State Governments in 2008. He is also the President/CEO of Koppelman & Associates, LLC, an award-winning advertising, marketing and public relations agency.

Birth
Kim Koppelman was born on 16 October 1956 in Breckenridge, Minnesota.

Education
Kim Koppelman has received his education from the following institution:
BS, North Dakota State College of Science, 1976

Professional experience
Koppelman has had the following professional experience:
President/CEO, Koppelman and Associates, 1984–present
Director of Advertising, Marketing and Public Relations, C.R. Limited, 1982-1984
Editor, 1980-1981
Director of Instrumental Music, North Sargent Public Schools, 1975
Account Executive
Chief Executive Officer, Covenant Builders

Political experience
Koppelman has had the following political experience:
Candidate, United States House of Representatives, 2012
Representative, North Dakota State House, 1994–present
Riverside City Council, 1984-1988
Emergency Management Coordinator, City Council, 1986-1988
Representative, Metropolitan Council of Governments, 1986-1988
Member, Committee on Suggested State Legislature

References

External links
Kim Koppelman

1956 births
21st-century American politicians
Living people
North Dakota city council members
North Dakota State College of Science alumni
People from Breckenridge, Minnesota
Republican Party members of the North Dakota House of Representatives